The Perpetual Orgy: Flaubert and Madame Bovary (1975) is a book-length essay by the Nobel Prize–winning Peruvian novelist Mario Vargas Llosa which examines Flaubert's 1857 book Madame Bovary as the first modern novel. The first part of Flaubert's novel has an autobiographical tone ; Vargas Llosa then goes on to examine the structure and meaning of Madame Bovary as well as its role in the development of the modern novel. First published in Spanish in 1975, the book was translated into English in 1986 by Helen Lane.

According to Julian Barnes:

John Gross, also reviewing the Helen Lane translation for The New York Times, praised the book's treatment of Flaubert's technical mastery:

References

1975 non-fiction books
1975 essays
Essays about literature
Essays by Mario Vargas Llosa
Seix Barral books